Conus leekremeri is a species of sea snail, a marine gastropod mollusk in the family Conidae, the cone snails and their allies.

Like all species within the genus Conus, these snails are predatory and venomous. They are capable of "stinging" humans, therefore live ones should be handled carefully or not at all.

Description 
Original description: "Shell thin, elongated, with high widely scalariform spire; body whorl shiny, highly polished, ornamented with numerous low, rounded spiral cords; cords become large and more numerous around the anterior end; spire whorls ornamented with 4 large, spiral threads; spire whorls concave, producing canaliculated whorls; canaliculate spire edged with low, rounded carina along edge of shoulder; carina follows edge of suture on canaliculate spire whorls; sides of body whorl distinctly concave and indented, producing an emaciated, waisted appearance; aperture long and very narrow; body whorl, spire, and interior of aperture pure white; periostracum thin, transparent yellow."

The maximum recorded shell length is 30 mm.

Distribution
Locus typicus: "Southern coast of Grand Bahama Island."

This marine species occurs off the Bahamas.

Habitat 
Minimum recorded depth is 240 m. Maximum recorded depth is 240 m.

References

 Petuch, E. J. 1987. New Caribbean Molluscan Faunas. 54, plate 9, figure 7–8.
 Tucker J.K. & Tenorio M.J. (2009) Systematic classification of Recent and fossil conoidean gastropods. Hackenheim: Conchbooks. 296 pp.
 Puillandre N., Duda T.F., Meyer C., Olivera B.M. & Bouchet P. (2015). One, four or 100 genera? A new classification of the cone snails. Journal of Molluscan Studies. 81: 1–23

External links
 The Conus Biodiversity website
 

leekremeri
Gastropods described in 1987